William Russell Robertson (June 17, 1853 – November 7, 1930) was a Canadian politician. He served in the Legislative Assembly of British Columbia from 1899 to 1900 from the electoral district of Cowichan.

References

1853 births
1930 deaths
Members of the Legislative Assembly of British Columbia
People from the United Counties of Stormont, Dundas and Glengarry